The men's coxless four (M4-) competition at the 1984 Summer Olympics took place at Lake Casitas in Ventura County, California, United States. It was held from 31 July to 5 August and the outcome was wide open due to the Eastern Bloc boycott and thus the absence of the dominating team from the Soviet Union, and previously East Germany. The event was won by the team from New Zealand.

Background
Beginning in 1966, East Germany was for many years the dominating nation in the men's coxless four event at European, World, and Olympic level. Their last gold came with the 1980 Summer Olympics. At the three subsequent World Championships, the Soviet Union had the best success (with one gold and two silvers), followed by Switzerland (one gold and one silver) and West Germany (one gold). With the Eastern Bloc nations absent due to their boycott, the field was wide open.

Previous M4- competitions

Results

Heats
The first two races were held on 31 July. Five teams competed per heat, and the winner would progress to the A final. The remaining teams would progress to the repechage.

Heat 1

Heat 2

Repechage
Two repechages were held on 2 August with four teams each. The first two teams would progress to the A final, whilst the remaining two teams would go to the B final.

Heat 1
The Chinese team changed all four seats for the repechage. This was the only seat change during the coxless four competition.

Heat 2

Finals
Four teams competed in the B final for places 7 to 10, and six teams competed in the A final.

B final
The B final was held on 3 August.

A final
The A final was held on 5 August.

Notes

References 
 
Volume 1 Part 1
Volume 1 Part 2
Volume 1 Part 3
 
Volume 2 Part 1
Volume 2 Part 2
Volume 2 Part 3 (page 469 onwards)

Men's coxless four
Men's events at the 1984 Summer Olympics